Ferdinand "Bobby Little Bra" Gaynair is a saxophone player from Jamaica who now lives in Canada. He was born in East Kingston in the 1920s. He received an Order of Distinction.
He was part of the Alpha Boys School. He played and recorded with various musicians including Count Ossie.

Gaynair married and moved to Canada. His older brother Wilton Gaynair was also a musician.

He said he dated rhumba dancer Margarita Mahfood before Don Drummond dated her. He performed regularly with Drummond and the Skatalites. He lives in Nova Scotia. In the summer of 2002 he performed with the Legends of Ska, a reunion of Ska musicians.

Discography
"Come Together"

References

Jamaican musicians
Year of birth missing (living people)
Saxophonists
Living people
1920s births